Saint-Bonnet-lès-Allier (literally Saint-Bonnet near Allier; Auvergnat: Sent Bonet d'Alèir) is a commune in the Puy-de-Dôme department in Auvergne-Rhône-Alpes in central France.

See also
Communes of the Puy-de-Dôme department

References

Saintbonnetlesallier